Prodilidine is an opioid analgesic which is a ring-contracted analogue of prodine. It has around the same analgesic efficacy as codeine, but is only around 1/3 the potency (100mg prodilidine is equivalent to 3mg oral morphine). It has little abuse potential.

See also 
 Profadol

References 

Opioids
Propionate esters
Pyrrolidines
Mu-opioid receptor agonists